Copenhagen Skatepark, also referred to as CPH Skatepark, is an indoor skateboarding  venue located at Enghavevej in the Kongens Enghave district of Copenhagen, Denmark. Copenhagen Skatepark is also involved in the operation of a 4,500 square metre outdoor skatepark in Fælledparken in which opened in 2011.

History
Copenhagen Skatepark opened in a former painting workshop of Copenhagen's tramways in 2003. In 2010, it was joined at the site by StreetMekka, a centre for street sports and street art.

Facilities
The vert ramp was at the time of its inauguration the largest in Scandinavia. The street section is divided into three pyramids. There are also  ledges, handrails, trapper, quarters og launches. Other facilities include changing rooms, lounge area and a balcony for spectators.

Annual events

Copenhagen Pro
Copenhagen Skatepark plays host to the annual skateboarding competition Copenhagen Pro (CpH Pro). The first competition was held in 2007.

Trailerpark Festival
Every year in August, Copenhagen Skatepark arranges the three'day Trailerpark Festival which presents a programme of music, art and performances.

References

External links
 Official website
 Project on Krydsrum Architects' website

Sports venues in Copenhagen
Skateparks in Denmark